Tarasovo is a rural locality (a selo) in Miroshnikovskoye Rural Settlement, Kotovsky District, Volgograd Oblast, Russia. The population was 99 as of 2010. There are 3 streets.

Geography 
Tarasovo is located in steppe, on Volga Upland, on the right bank of the Tarasovka River, 30 km north of Kotovo (the district's administrative centre) by road. Doroshevo is the nearest rural locality.

References 

Rural localities in Kotovsky District
Kamyshinsky Uyezd